Jere Hiltunen (born 11 June 1999) is a Finnish professional footballer who plays as a striker.

References

1999 births
Living people
Finnish footballers
JIPPO players
Kuopion Palloseura players
SC Kuopio Futis-98 players
Veikkausliiga players
Kakkonen players
Ykkönen players
Association football forwards